Břežany is a municipality and village in Klatovy District in the Plzeň Region of the Czech Republic. It has about 200 inhabitants. The historic centre of the village is well preserved and is protected by law as a village monument zone.

Gallery

References

Villages in Klatovy District